Thomas Franck may refer to:

 Thomas M. Franck (1931–2009), American international law scholar
 Thomas Franck (footballer) (born 1971), German footballer

See also
Thomas Frank (disambiguation)